Kemper County is a county located on the central eastern border of the U.S. state of Mississippi. As of the 2020 census, the population was 8,988. Its county seat is De Kalb. The county is named in honor of Reuben Kemper.

The county is part of the Meridian, MS Micropolitan Statistical Area. In 2010 the Mississippi Public Service Commission approved construction of the Kemper Project, designed to use "clean coal" to produce electricity for 23 counties in the eastern part of the state. , it was not completed and had cost overruns. It is designed as a model project to use gasification and carbon-capture technologies at this scale.

East Mississippi Community College is located in Kemper County in the town of Scooba, at the junction of US 45 and Mississippi Highway 16.

History

In the wake of the county's founding, Abel Mastin Key served as the first circuit clerk. Land in the area was developed in the 19th century by white planters for cotton cultivation using enslaved African Americans. Blacks have comprised the majority of the county population since before the American Civil War. The county continues to be largely rural.

After the American Civil War and Reconstruction, racial violence increased as whites struggled to regain power over the majority population of freedmen and to suppress their voting. In the period from 1877 to 1950, Kemper County had 24 documented lynchings of African Americans, the third-highest of Mississippi counties. Hinds and Leflore counties had 29 and 48 lynchings, respectively, in this period. This form of racial terrorism was at its height in the decades around the turn of the 20th century, which followed the state's disenfranchisement of most blacks in 1890 through creating barriers to voter registration.

In 1877 the Chisolm Massacre occurred, the murder by a mob of a judge, his children, and two of their friends while they were in protective custody in jail.

In 1890, blacks made up the majority of the county' population: 10,084 blacks to 7,845 whites. They generally worked as sharecroppers or tenant farmers. Often illiterate, many of the sharecroppers were at a disadvantage in the annual accounting that was done by the landowners. Sometimes the planters had grocery stores on their property and required the sharecroppers to buy all their goods there, adding to their debt.

Beginning in late December 1906, there were several days of racial terror in the county. After violent incidents on the railroad between conductors and black passengers, whites attacked blacks at the rural towns of Wahalak and Scooba; by December 27, whites had killed a total of 13 blacks in rioting. The events started with a physical confrontation between a conductor and an African-American man on a Mobile & Ohio Railroad train. The conductor was cut, and he fatally shot two black men. George Simpson, another African American thought to be involved, escaped from the train. When captured in Wahalak by a posse, he killed a white constable and was quickly lynched by the other whites.

As reported by The New York Times,

Not satisfied with the punishment of this man, the whites immediately set out to strike terror into the negroes, who had been getting defiant of late. They found two sons of Simpson and lynched them, filling their bodies with bullets. Two other negroes who had behaved defiantly were treated in similar fashion.

Whites worried about blacks gathering to take revenge at Wahalak, where they had already been abused by lynchings. Local authorities called for state militia. Their commanding officer took his troops away from Wahalak, although there was still unrest, because he felt they were not being treated properly.

By the end of the day on December 26, white men in Scooba had killed another five black men. The county sheriff arrested several whites for these murders, and called for the state militia to go to Scooba. "All the men killed at Scooba today are said to be innocent of any crime, having been shot down merely as a matter of revenge by the rough whites." There had been a conflict on another train, in which a black man mortally shot a conductor, George Harrison. The yardmaster shot and killed the African American. The rioting by whites in Scooba started after Harrison died. Governor James K. Vardaman went to Scooba with militia to establish control. He left a force of 20 there commanded by Adjutant General Fridge and returned to the state capital on the evening of December 27. That day the body of another murdered African-American man was found in the woods, bringing the total killed in Scooba to six.

In 1934, three African-American suspects in Kemper County were repeatedly whipped in order to force them to confess to murder. In Brown v. Mississippi (1936), the U.S. Supreme Court unanimously ruled such forced confessions violated the Due Process Clause of the Fourteenth Amendment, and were inadmissible at trial.

The peak of population in the rural county was in 1930. Mechanization of agriculture decreased the need for farm labor. From 1940 to 1970, the population declined markedly, as may be seen on the table below, as people moved to other areas for work. This was also the period of the second wave of the Great Migration, when 5 million African Americans moved out of the South to the North and especially to the West Coast, where the defense industry had many jobs, beginning during World War II.

Geography

Major highways
  U.S. Highway 45
  Mississippi Highway 16
  Mississippi Highway 21
  Mississippi Highway 39

Adjacent counties
 Noxubee County (north)
 Sumter County, Alabama (east)
 Lauderdale County (south)
 Neshoba County (west)
 Winston County (northwest)

Demographics

2020 census

As of the 2020 United States Census, there were 8,988 people, 3,611 households, and 2,201 families residing in the county.

2010 census
As of the 2010 United States Census, there were 10,456 people living in the county. 60.1% were Black or African American, 35.3% White, 3.7% Native American, 0.1% Asian, 0.1% of some other race and 0.7% of two or more races. 0.5% were Hispanic or Latino (of any race).

2000 census
As of the census of 2000, there were 10,453 people, 3,909 households, and 2,787 families living in the county.  The population density was 14 people per square mile (5/km2).  There were 4,533 housing units at an average density of 6 per square mile (2/km2).  The racial makeup of the county was 58.13% Black or African American, 39.03% White, 2.06% Native American, 0.08% Asian, 0.03% Pacific Islander, 0.11% from other races, and 0.57% from two or more races.  0.73% of the population were Hispanic or Latino of any race.

There were 3,909 households, out of which 32.20% had children under the age of 18 living with them, 46.70% were married couples living together, 20.20% had a female householder with no husband present, and 28.70% were non-families. 26.40% of all households were made up of individuals, and 12.60% had someone living alone who was 65 years of age or older.  The average household size was 2.57 and the average family size was 3.11.

In the county, the population was spread out, with 25.40% under the age of 18, 12.50% from 18 to 24, 25.20% from 25 to 44, 21.80% from 45 to 64, and 15.10% who were 65 years of age or older.  The median age was 35 years. For every 100 females there were 92.20 males.  For every 100 females age 18 and over, there were 88.30 males.

The median income for a household in the county was $23,998, and the median income for a family was $30,248. Males had a median income of $24,431 versus $18,199 for females. The per capita income for the county was $11,985.  About 21.20% of families and 26.00% of the population were below the poverty line, including 35.30% of those under age 18 and 26.70% of those age 65 or over.

Education

Public school districts
 Kemper County School District
Kemper County is within the service area of the East Mississippi Community College system. The main campus of EMCC, including the college system's administrative headquarters, is in the Scooba Campus in Scooba.

Government
The county is governed by a five-member elected Board of Supervisors, who are elected from single-member districts. The County Sheriff, Chancery Clerk, Circuit Clerk, and Tax Assessor are also elected to office.

Kemper County generally votes for candidates of the Democratic Party; the Republican presidential nominee has won it only four times in the past century.

Electric power plant

In 2010, the Mississippi Public Service Commission approved the construction of a lignite coal plant in Kemper County to be financed by electricity customers in twenty-three southeastern Mississippi counties being served by Mississippi Power Company. It is designed as a model project to use gasification and carbon-capture technologies at this scale.

The plant was strongly opposed by former Republican State Chairman Clarke Reed of Greenville, who favored a less-expensive natural gas-fueled plant. Reed called the project "... a horrible thing." He said it would be a political issue that could be used against Republicans for years.

The Kemper Project was scheduled to open in the third quarter of 2016, more than two years behind schedule. Its cost increased to $6.6 billion—three times original cost estimate. , the project was still not in service, and the cost had increased to $7.1 billion.

Communities

Towns
 De Kalb (county seat)
 Scooba

Census-designated places
 Bogue Chitto (mostly in Neshoba County)
 Porterville

Unincorporated communities
 Cullum
 Electric Mills
 Moscow
 Preston
 Sucarnoochee
 Tamola
 Wahalak

Ghost town
 Binnsville
 Minden

Notable residents
Eddie Briggs, 28th Lt. Governor of Mississippi
Bud Brown, former pro football player, was born in DeKalb
Clay Hopper, professional baseball player
Sampson Jackson, served in the Mississippi State Senate, was born in Preston
John J. Pettus, 23rd Governor of Mississippi, previously represented Kemper County in the Mississippi House of Representatives and the Mississippi State Senate
Devonta Pollard, professional basketball player
J.H. Rush, who founded the first private hospital in Meridian
John C. Stennis, who served as United States Senator from 1947 to 1988, was born in Kemper County

See also
 National Register of Historic Places listings in Kemper County, Mississippi

 USS Kemper County (LST-854)

References

External links
 Kemper County Courthouse Pictures
 Memorial Foundation of the Germanna Colonies in Virginia, Inc.
 Kemper County Sheriff

 
Mississippi counties
1833 establishments in Mississippi
Populated places established in 1833
County in Meridian micropolitan area
Counties of Appalachia
White American riots in the United States
1906 riots
Racially motivated violence against African Americans
Riots and civil disorder in Mississippi
History of racism in Mississippi
Black Belt (U.S. region)
Majority-minority counties in Mississippi